General Acha Airport is a public use airport  south of General Acha, a town in the La Pampa Province of Argentina.

The middle  of the runway is asphalt paved, while the rest is grass.

See also

Transport in Argentina
List of airports in Argentina

References

External links 
OpenStreetMap - General Acha
FallingRain - General Acha Airport

Airports in Argentina
La Pampa Province